Coele-Syria (also spelt Coele Syria, Coelesyria, Celesyria) alternatively Coelo-Syria or Coelosyria (Koílē Syría, 'Hollow Syria';  or ), was a region of Syria in classical antiquity. It probably derived from the Aramaic word for all of the region of Syria, but it was most often applied to the Beqaa Valley between the Lebanon and the Anti-Lebanon mountain ranges. The area is  now part of the modern-day Syria and Lebanon.

Name
It is widely accepted that the term Coele is a transcription of Aramaic kul, meaning "all, the entire", such that the term originally identified all of Syria. The word "Coele", which literally means "hollow" in Koine Greek, is thought to have come about via a folk etymology referring to the "hollow" Beqaa Valley between Mount Lebanon and the Anti-Lebanon Mountains. However, the term Coele-Syria was also used in a wider sense to indicate "all Syria" or "all Syria except Phoenicia", by the writers;  Pliny, Arrian, Ptolemy and also Diodorus Siculus, who indicated Coele-Syria to at least stretch as far south as Joppa, while Polybius stated that the border between Egypt and Coele-Syria lay between the towns of Rhinocolara and Rhaphia.

The first and only official use of the term was during the period of Seleucid rule of the region, between c. 200 BCE and 64 BCE. During this period, the term "Coele Syria and Phoenicia" or "Coele Syria" was also used in a narrower sense to refer to the former Ptolemaic territory which the Seleucids now controlled, being the area south of the river Eleutherus. This usage was adopted by Strabo and the Books of the Maccabees. However, Greek writers such as Agatharchides and Polemon of Athens used the term Palestine to refer to the region during this period, which was a term originally given circa 450 BCE by Herodotus. Later during the Roman Period c.350 CE, Eunapius wrote that the capital of Coele-Syria was the Seleucid city of Antioch, north of the Eleutherus.

Official usage

According to Polybius, a former officer of the Ptolemaic Empire named Ptolemy Thrasea, having fought in the 217 BCE Battle of Raphia, defected to the Seleucid king Antiochus III the Great. Antiochus gave him the title "Strategos and Archiereus of Coele-Syria and Phoenicia". Some scholars speculate that this title may have been used previously by the Ptolemies, but no direct evidence exists to support this.

Syrian Wars

The region was disputed between the Seleucid dynasty and the Ptolemaic dynasty during the Syrian Wars. Alexander the Great's general Ptolemy first occupied Coele-Syria in 318 BC. However, when Ptolemy joined the coalition against Antigonus I Monophthalmus in 313 BC, he quickly withdrew from Coele-Syria. In 312 BC Seleucus I Nicator, defeated Demetrius, the son of Antigonus, in the Battle of Gaza which again allowed Ptolemy to occupy Coele-Syria. Though he was again to pull out after only a few months, after Demetrius had won a battle over his general and Antigonus entered Syria in force  up to Antigonuses, this brief success had enabled Seleucus to make a dash for Babylonia which Seleucus secured. In 302 BC, Ptolemy joined a new coalition against Antigonus and reoccupied Coele-Syria, but quickly withdrew on hearing a false report that Antigonus had won a victory. He was only to return when Antigonus had been defeated at Ipsus in 301 BC. Coele-Syria was assigned to Seleucus, by the victors of Ipsus, as Ptolemy had added nothing to the victory. Though, given Ptolemy's track record, he was unlikely to organize a serious defense of Coele-Syria, Seleucus acquiesced in Ptolemy's occupation, probably because Seleucus remembered how it had been with Ptolemy's help he had reestablished himself in Babylonia.

The later Seleucids were not to be so understanding, resulting in the century of Syrian Wars between the Ptolemies and Seleucids. The Battle of Panium in 200 BC, during the Fifth Syrian War, was the final decisive battle between the two sides in ending Ptolemaic control over the region. The 171–168 BC conflicts over Coele-Syria, between Antiochus IV Epiphanes and Ptolemy VI Philometor, are discussed in Livy's The History of Rome from its Foundation (in XLII. 29 and XLV. 11–12).

Seleucid control over the area of Judea began diminishing with the eruption of the Maccabean Revolt in 165 BC. With Seleucid troops being involved in warfare on the Parthian front, Judea succeeded in securing its independence by 140 BC. Despite attempts of Seleucid rulers to regain territories, the conquests of Pompey in 64 BC were a decisive blow to them, and Syria became part of the Roman Republic.

Upper Syria

Under the Macedonian kings, Upper Syria (Syria Superior) was divided into four parts (tetrarchies) which were named after their capitals. Later in the Roman Pompeian era, the province was divided into nine districts.

Nomenclatures of Syria

Judging from Arrian and The Anabasis of Alexander, the historians of Alexander the Great, as well as more ancient authors, gave the name of Syria to all the country comprehended between the Tigris and the Mediterranean. The part to the east of the Euphrates, afterwards named Mesopotamia was called "Syria between the rivers;" that to the west was called by the general name Coele-Syria, and although Phoenicia and Palestine were sometimes separated from it. Yet, it was often comprehended as the whole country as far as Egypt.

{| border="0" class="wikitable" style="text-align:center"
! colspan=3 | Nomenclatures of Syria given in the time of Cyrus the Great c. 530 BCE
|-
! Primary
| Kul Eber-Nari
| All Across-the-River
|-
! Alternate
| Koile Syria
| Corrupt Greek translation
|}

Circa 323 BCE Laomedon of Mytilene takes control of Coele-Syria (dissolving Eber-Nari).
Circa 323 BCE The Periplus of Pseudo-Scylax lists several cities on the Palestinian coast (Dor, Jaffa, Ascalon, and Acre) that are incorporated into Coele-Syria.

In the Wars of the Diadochi, Coele-Syria came under the control of Antigonus I Monophthalmus. Then in 301 BCE, Ptolemy I Soter exploited events surrounding the Battle of Ipsus to take control of the region. The victors at Ipsus finalized the breakup of Alexander's empire. Coele-Syria was allocated to Ptolemy's former ally Seleucus I Nicator, who—having been previously aided by Ptolemy—took no military action to gain control of the region. Their successors, however, became embroiled in a series of conflicts over this issue.

Wars over Coele-Syria given by Polybius c. 150 BCE
Ptolemy, marching on Pelusium, made his first halt at that city, and after picking up stragglers and serving out rations to his men moved on marching through the desert and skirting Mount Casius and the marshes called Barathra. Reaching the spot he was bound for on the fifth day he encamped at a distance of fifty stades from Raphia, (Modern Rafah at the border of Egypt and Israel, north of Rhinocolara (El Arish)) which is the first city of Coele-Syria on the Egyptian side after Rhinocolura.

Circa 120 BCE In the written work, 1 Maccabees ;And king Demetrius made Apollonius his general, who was governor of Celesyria: and he gathered together a great army, and came to Jamnia.
Circa 100 BCE In the written work, 2 Maccabees ;And when he could not overcome Onias, he went to Apollonius, the son of Tharseas, who at that time was governor of Celesyria, and Phenicia.2 Maccabees
3:8. So Heliodorus forthwith began his journey, under a colour of visiting the cities of Celesyria and Phenicia, but indeed to fulfil the king's purpose.
8:8. Then Philip seeing that the man gained ground by little and little, and that things for the most part succeeded prosperously with him, wrote to Ptolemee, the governor of Celesyria and Phenicia, to send aid to the king's affairs.

Boundaries of Egypt given by Diodorus Siculus c. 50 BCE
Having spoken of the three boundaries of Egypt, by which it is distinguished from the rest of the continent, we now proceed to the next. The fourth side is nearly surrounded with a vast sea, without any harbours, being a very long and tedious voyage, and very difficult to find any place of landing. For from Parcetonium in Africa, to Joppa in Cœlo-Syria, for the space almost of five thousand furlongs, there is not one safe harbour to be found, except Pharus.

Circa 25 BCE Livy in his written work, The History of Rome ;Antiochus was so incensed, ...He at once sent his fleet to Cyprus, and in the first days of spring set his army in motion for Egypt and advanced into Coelo-Syria. When near Rhinocolura he was met by envoys from Ptolemy, who ...begged him to say clearly what he wanted rather than to attack Ptolemy as an enemy—by force of arms—after previously being his friend.

Coele-Syria Proper 

Authors of the Roman period differ on the limits of Coele-Syria, some extending and others contracting them. The Geography of Strabo notes that Coele Syria Propria (Proper) is defined by the Libanus and Anti-libanus mountain ranges, running parallel to each other. In the wars between the Ptolemies and the Seleucidæ, the name Cœle (or Hollow Syria) was applied to the whole of the southern portion of Syria, but under the Romans, it was confined to "Cœlesyria Proper" and variously included the district east of Anti-Libanus, about Damascus, and a portion of Palestine east of the Jordan river (possibly of: Trans-Jordan, Perea, or the Decapolis).

{| border="0" class="wikitable" style="text-align:center"
! colspan=3 | Nomenclatures of Syria given by Strabo c. 10 BCE
|-
! Primary
| Cœlê-Syria & Seleucis-Syria & Phœnicia &c. &c.
| Cœlê-Syria ≠ Cœlo-Syrians
|-
! Alternate
| Cœlo-Syrians & Syrians & Phœnicians
| Similar to nomenclature given by Herodotus 
|}

Circa 36 CE Philo of Alexandria in his written work, On the Life of Moses ; When then [Moses] he received the supreme authority, with the good will of all his subjects, God himself being the regulator and approver of all his actions, he conducted his people as a colony into Phoenicia, and into the hollow Syria (Coele-syria), and Palestine, which was at that time called the land of the Canaanites, the borders of which country were three days' journey distant from Egypt.
Circa 43 CE Pomponius Mela in his written work, Description of the World ; Syria holds a broad expanse of the littoral, as well as lands that extend rather broadly into the interior, and it is designated by different names in different places. For example, it is called Coele, Mesopotamia, Judaea, Commagene, and Sophene. It is Palestine at the point where Syria abuts the Arabs, then Phoenicia, and then—where it reaches Cilicia—Antiochia. [...] In Palestine, however, is Gaza, a mighty and well fortified city.

The name Syria comes from the ancient Greek regional name for the Levantine colonies and colonial territories which they had established and which were "formerly comprehended as part of Assyria" (see Name of Syria). Syria had an uncertain border to the northeast that Pliny the Elder describes as including from west to east; Commagene, Sophene, and Adiabene. In Pliny's time, Syria was administratively divided into a number of provinces with various degrees of autonomy under the Roman Empire, such as the Ityraei or Ituraei, who were a people of Coelo-Syria famous for shooting with a bow, [The wood of the trees called] "yews are bent into Ituraean bows".
{| border="0" class="wikitable" style="text-align:center"
! colspan=3 | Nomenclatures of Syria given by Pliny the Elder c.70 CE 
|-
! Primary
| Syria
| deprecated terms: Palæstina, Judæa, Cœle, Phœnice
|-
! Alternate
| Syria & Phœnice
|  
|}

Circa 70 CE Pliny the Elder in his written work, Natural History ; Next to these countries on the coast is Syria, once the greatest of lands. It had a multitude of divisions with different names, the part adjacent to Arabia was previously known as Palestine (who's northernmost city was Caesarea, Plin. NH 5.69: "Caesarea ..finis Palastine") or Judaea or Cœle.
Circa 100 CE Josephus in his written work, Antiquities of the Jews, notes that in 46 BCE Herod the Great was appointed as the "stratēgos" of Coele Syria, by the governor of Syria, Sextus Julius Caesar. And he also writes ; Antiochus made a friendship and league with Ptolemy, and gave him his daughter Cleopatra in marriage, and yielded up to him Cœle-Syria and Samaria and Judæa and Phœnicia by way of dowry.
Circa 125 CE The Roman emperor Hadrian promotes the city of Damascus to "Metropolis of Coele-Syria".

Circa 150 CE Appian in his written work, Roman History ; Intending to write the history of the Romans, I have deemed it necessary to begin with the boundaries of the nations under their sway.... Here turning our course and passing round, we take in Palestine-Syria, and beyond it a part of Arabia. The Phoenicians hold the country next to Palestine on the sea, and beyond the Phoenician territory are Coele-Syria, and the parts stretching from the sea as far inland as the river Euphrates, namely Palmyra and the sandy country round about, extending even to the Euphrates itself.

The Decapolis was so called from its ten cities enumerated by Pliny. What Pliny calls Decapolis, Ptolemy makes his Cœle-Syria; and the Cœle-Syria of Pliny, is that part of Syria about Aleppo.

Towns in Coelesyria given by Ptolemy c. 150 CE that are distinct from Pliny's Decapolis
Heliopolis
Abila which is called Lysinia (Abila Lysanios)
Saana
Ina
Samulis (Samoulis)
Abida
Capitolias
Adra
Canatha

Provincia Syria Coele 

The governor of Syria retained the civil administration of the whole large province undiminished, and held for long alone in all Asia a command of the first rank. It was only in the course of the second century that a diminution of his prerogatives occurred, when Hadrian took one of the four legions from the governor of Syria and handed it over to the governor of Palestine. It was Severus who at length withdrew the first place in the Roman military hierarchy from the Syrian governor. After having subdued the province  —which had wished at that time to make Niger emperor, as it had formerly done with its governor Vespasian —amidst resistance from the capital Antioch in particular, he ordained its partition into a northern and a southern half, and gave to the governor of the former, which was called Coele-Syria, two legions, to the governor of the latter, the province of Syro-Phoenicia, one [legion].
{| border="0" class="wikitable" style="text-align:center"
! colspan=3 | Nomenclature of Syria given in the time of Septimius Severus c.200 CE
|-
| Syria
| Provincia Syria Coele
| Syria Coele ≠ Cœlê-Syria ≠ Cœlo-Syrians
|-
| Phoenice
| Provincia Syria Phoenice
|  
|-
| Palestina
| Provincia Syria Palæstina
|  
|-
| Arabia
| Provincia Arabia Petraea
|  
|}

Circa 200 CE. Ulpian, On Taxes, Book I;
There is also the colony of Laodicea, in Coele Syria, to which also the divine Severus granted the Italian Law on account of its services in the Civil War.

Boundaries of the 'Promised Land' given by Jerome c. 400 CE
You may delineate the Promised Land of Moses from the Book of Numbers (ch. 34): as bounded on the south by the desert tract called Sina, between the Dead Sea and the city of Kadesh-barnea, [which is located with the Arabah to the east] and continues to the west, as far as the river of Egypt, that discharges into the open sea near the city of Rhinocolara; as bounded on the west by the sea along the coasts of Palestine, Phoenicia, Coele-Syria, and Cilicia; as bounded on the north by the circle formed by the Taurus Mountains and Zephyrium and extending to Hamath, called Epiphany-Syria; as bounded on the east by the city of Antioch Hippos and Lake Kinneret, now called Tiberias, and then the Jordan River which discharges into the salt sea, now called the Dead Sea.Hieronymus (1910). "Epistola CXXIX Ad Dardanum de Terra promissionis (al. 129; scripta circa annum 414ce)". Epistularum Pars III —Epistulae 121-154, p. 171 (The fifty-sixth volume of Corpus Scriptorum Ecclesiasticorum Latinorum also known as the Vienna Corpus: Letters Part 3, Containing letters 121-154 of St. Jerome.) Image of p. 171 at Archive.org

Circa 400 CE Eunapius in his written work, Lives of Philosophers and Sophists ; 
Libanius (died 392 CE) was born at Antioch, the capital of Coele Syria as it is called. This city was founded by Seleucus surnamed Nicator.
Capital of the Seleucid Empire was Antioch (240–63 BCE)
Capital of the Syria Coele (Roman province) was Antioch (200–600 CE)

See also
Hasmonean kingdom
Roman Syria
Herodian kingdom
Tetrarchy (Judea)
Judaea (Roman province)
Syria Palaestina

Notes

Further reading

External links

 
History of Palestine (region)
Ptolemaic Kingdom
Seleucid Empire
4th century BC
3rd century BC
2nd century BC
1st century BC
Historical regions